Jaffar bin Hussein (11 June 1931 – 11 August 1998) was a Malaysian banker and economist who served as the 4th Governor of the Central Bank of Malaysia from 1985 to 1994.

Background 
Jaffar graduated with a commerce degree from the University of Queensland in 1958. He served as chairman and chief executive of Malayan Banking Berhad prior to his appointment as Bank Negara Governor.

Death 
Jaffar died of pneumonia at the Subang Jaya Medical Centre on 11 August 1998, aged 67. He was buried at the Bukit Kiara Muslim Cemetery in Kuala Lumpur.

Honours

Honours of Malaysia 
  :
  Companion of the Order of Loyalty to the Crown of Malaysia (JSM) (1974)
  Commander of the Order of Loyalty to the Crown of Malaysia (PSM) – Tan Sri (1987)
  :
  Knight Commander of the Order of the Crown of Johor (DPMJ) – Dato' (1980)
  Knight Grand Commander of the Order of the Crown of Johor (SPMJ) – Dato' (1986)
  :
  Grand Knight of the Order of the Crown of Pahang (SIMP) – Dato', later Dato' Indera (1990)

References 

1931 births
1998 deaths
Governors of the Central Bank of Malaysia
Malaysian civil servants
Malaysian bankers
Malaysian economists
People from Johor
People from Muar
Commanders of the Order of Loyalty to the Crown of Malaysia
Knights Grand Commander of the Order of the Crown of Johor
Knights Commander of the Order of the Crown of Johor
Companions of the Order of Loyalty to the Crown of Malaysia
University of Queensland alumni